Matabele may refer to:

Northern Ndebele people
, a destroyer of the Royal Navy
Matabele (beetle), a genus of beetle in the family Carabidae

See also
Ndebele (disambiguation)